Gūbriai is a village in the Šilalė District Municipality, Tauragė County, Lithuania. According to the 2011 census, the village had a population of 80 people, a decline from 97 in 2001 and 248 in 1959.

References

Villages in Tauragė County